Metropolitan College of Music can refer to:

Metropolitan College of Music, New York, founded 1891, merged into American Institute of Applied Music in 1900
Metropolitan College of Music, London, founded 1889, merged into London Academy of Music and Dramatic Art in 1904